Jules-Richard Matton was born on 10 October 1897. He was a Belgian racing cyclist. He rode in the 1922 Tour de France. Matton died on 21 October 1973

References

1897 births
1973 deaths
Belgian male cyclists
Place of birth missing